Winston Shripal Murray (31 January 1941 – 22 November 2010) was a Guyanese politician and who was Deputy Prime Minister of Guyana from 1985 to 1992. He was a member of the  People's National Congress party, serving as its shadow minister for finance at the time of his death.

References

1941 births
2010 deaths
20th-century Guyanese lawyers
Members of the National Assembly (Guyana)
People's National Congress (Guyana) politicians
Government ministers of Guyana
Democratic Action Congress politicians